Aonghas is a masculine given name in Scottish Gaelic. Derived from the Old Irish given name Oíngus, it is composed of Celtic elements meaning "one" and "choice". A variant spelling of the Scottish Gaelic name (which is also found in Ireland as an alternative spelling of the Irish form of the name) is Aonghus. The Irish form of the Scottish Gaelic names is Aengus. A pet form of the Scottish Gaelic name is Angaidh, which is represented in English as Angie.

The earliest form of the given name Angus, and its cognates, occurs in Adomnán's Vita Columbae (Life of Columba) as Oinogusius, Oinogussius. This name likely refers to a Pictish king whose name is recorded variously as Onnust, Hungus. According to historian Alex Woolf, the early Gaelic form of the name, Oengus, was borrowed from the Pictish Onuist, which appears in British as Ungust. Woolf derived all these names from Celtic *Oinogustos, which linguist John Kneen derived from *oino-gustos meaning "one-choice". Woolf also stated that between about AD 350 and AD 660, the Insular Celtic dialects underwent changes which included the loss of the final syllables and unstressed vowels, which transformed *Oinogustos to *Oingust.

People with the given name

Aonghas
Aonghas mac Somhairle, (fl. 13th century), Scottish nobleman, son of Somerled
Aonghas MacNeacail, (born 1942), Scottish Gaelic writer
Aonghas Mór, (fl. 13th century), Scottish nobleman, son of Domhnall mac Raghnaill
Aonghas Óg of Islay, (fl. 14th century), Scottish nobleman, son of Aonghas Mór
Aonghas Óg, (died 1490), Scottish nobleman, son of John of Islay, Earl of Ross

Aonghus
Aonghus Fionn Ó Dálaigh, (fl. 1520-1570), Irish poet
Aonghus Óg of Islay, (died 1314×1318/c.1330), Scottish magnate
Aonghus McAnally, (born 1955), Irish broadcaster
Aonghus Óg McAnally, (born 1980), Irish actor
Aonghus Mór, (died c. 1293), Scottish magnate
Aonghus Ruadh Ó Dálaigh, (died 1350), Irish poet

References

Scottish Gaelic masculine given names
Scottish masculine given names